Eccrisis distincta is a species of beetle in the family Cerambycidae. It was described by Fairmaire in 1901.

References

Dorcasominae
Beetles described in 1901